Pierre Chasselat (1753–1814) was a French miniature painter and a pupil of Vien. He exhibited watercolour drawings and miniatures from 1793 to 1810. He was born and died in Paris.

He was the father of the painter Charles Abraham Chasselat, and grandfather of Henri Jean Saint-Ange Chasselat, also a painter

References

External links

Maev Kennedy. "Huge testicular tumour helps identify subject of 19th century portrait", The Guardian, 24 May 2011.

Year of birth unknown
1814 deaths
Painters from Paris
18th-century French painters
French male painters
19th-century French painters
Portrait miniaturists
1753 births
19th-century French male artists
18th-century French male artists